Carst Posthuma (11 January 1868 – 21 December 1939) was a Dutch cricket player of the late 19th/early 20th century. He was a left-handed batsman and left-arm fast bowler.

He played 72 times for the Dutch national team up to 1928, when he would have been sixty years old. He holds the Dutch record for most wickets in a career, taking 2,338 wickets at an average of 8.67 throughout his playing career. He was also the first Dutchman to take 100 wickets in a season in 1900, and the first to score a century in domestic cricket in 1894.

Perhaps the highest profile time of his career came in 1903 when he played five first-class games for W. G. Grace's London County Cricket Club. In his five matches, he took 23 wickets at an average of 15.04, with best bowling figures of 7/68 coming against Leicestershire.

References

External links

Cricinfo profile
Cricket Archive profile

Dutch cricketers
1868 births
1939 deaths
London County cricketers
Sportspeople from Haarlem
Dutch expatriate sportspeople in England